Greg Losey (February 9, 1950 – February 26, 2002) was an American modern pentathlete. He competed at the 1984 Summer Olympics, winning a silver medal in the team event.

References

1950 births
2002 deaths
American male modern pentathletes
Modern pentathletes at the 1984 Summer Olympics
Olympic silver medalists for the United States in modern pentathlon
Medalists at the 1984 Summer Olympics
20th-century American people
21st-century American people